The Knockout Stage of the 2000 World Group was the final stage of the World Group. The winners of each World Group pool joined last year's defending champion in a two-round knockout stage.

Draw

Semifinals

United States vs. Belgium

Czech Republic vs. Spain

Final

United States vs. Spain

References

See also
Fed Cup structure

World Group
2000 Fed Cup World Group